The 1885 Rutgers Queensmen football team represented Rutgers University in the 1885 college football season. The Queensmen played only one intercollegiate game, a 10-5 loss to Lehigh on November 14, 1885, in Bethlehem, Pennsylvania. The team had no coach, and its captain was Lewis Chamberlain.

Schedule

References

Rutgers
Rutgers Scarlet Knights football seasons
Rutgers Queensmen football